Praakmani  is a village in Võru Parish, Võru County in southeastern Estonia.

References

 

Võru Parish
Villages in Võru County